Prosobranchia was a large taxonomic subclass of sea snails, land snails and freshwater snails. This taxon of gastropods dates back to the 1920s. It has however been proven to be polyphyletic (consisting of more than one lineage of descent). Generally speaking in biology taxonomy is required to reflect phylogeny, in other words the classification of a group must reflect its evolutionary descent, as far as that is known, so the taxon Prosobranchia is no longer considered suitable to be used.

One can still encounter this subclass used as if it is still valid in many texts and websites. Although Prosobranchia is no longer generally accepted as a taxon by people who study living Mollusca, still the term prosobranch is legitimately used as an anatomically descriptive adjective or noun, and the taxon Prosobranchia is still sometimes used by paleontologists.

Prosobranch means gills in front (of the heart). In contrast opisthobranch means gills behind (and to the right of the heart). Prosobranchs have their gills, mantle cavity and anus situated in front of their heart. Most prosobranchs have separate sexes.

The majority of marine gastropods are prosobranch, as are a few land snails and freshwater snails. The prosobranch gastropods include the majority of marine snails, among them conches, cones, cowries, limpets, murexes, periwinkles, volutes and whelks, as well as numerous freshwater groups, and some land snails with an operculum.

Description

The majority of prosobranchs have an operculum, a corneous or calcareous plate situated on the dorsal surface of the foot. In many prosobranchs, the animal can completely close the aperture with the operculum.

The nervous system of prosobranchs is twisted into a figure 8 due to a developmental process known as torsion. The eyes are situated at the base of the tentacles.

Taxonomic context
The taxonomy of the gastropods is changing rapidly. The old classification (Johannes Thiele) divided Gastropoda into three subclasses: Prosobranchia, Opisthobranchia and Pulmonata. The subclass Prosobranchia (Henri Milne-Edwards) was further divided into the orders Archaeogastropoda, Mesogastropoda and Neogastropoda. The new version of the gastropod classification is explained in  Taxonomy of the Gastropoda (Ponder & Lindberg, 1997).

References
Thiele, J., 1929–1935. Handbuch der Systematischen Weichtierkunde. 2 vols. 1154 p., 584 figs.
Bieler, R. & P. M. Mikkelsen (eds.), 1992. Handbook of Systematic Malacology, Part 1 (Loricata [Polyplacophora]; Gastropoda: Prosobranchia).  Smithsonian Institution and National Science Foundation, xviii + 625 pp., 470+1 text-fig. (Annotated English-language edition of: Thiele, J., Handbuch der systematischen Weichtierkunde, Teil 1). Also published, in 1993, by Gustav Fischer Verlag, Stuttgart/Jena/New York.

 

Obsolete gastropod taxa
Gastropod taxonomy
Mollusc subclasses